Jacques Anton "Sjaak" Alberts (27 February 1926 – 21 July 1997) was a Dutch footballer who played as a defender. A one-club man, he played 11 years for Vitesse before retiring. He also competed in the men's tournament at the 1952 Summer Olympics for the Netherlands.

Career
Born in Arnhem, Alberts started playing football as a youth for Gelria from Velp. Later, he moved to Vitesse where he made his senior debut in the first team of the Arnhem-based club at the age of 16. Alberts was a defender who ten years after his debut decided to retire in order to focus entirely on a career outside football. He thereby rejected an offer from Wolverhampton Wanderers to become a professional in England.

References

External links
 

1926 births
1997 deaths
Dutch footballers
Netherlands international footballers
Olympic footballers of the Netherlands
Footballers at the 1952 Summer Olympics
Footballers from Arnhem
Association football defenders
SBV Vitesse players